Karel Effa (born Karel Effenberger; 23 May 1922 – 11 June 1993) was a Czechoslovak character actor who appeared in some 65 films.

Selected filmography

 Uloupená hranice (1947) - Závodcí
 Poslední mohykán (1947)
 Parohy (1947)
 Znamení kotvy (1947)
 Ves v pohranicí (1948) - Jarda
 Muzikant (1948) - Musician
 Zelezný dedek (1948) - Seller
 Cervená jesterka (1949)
 Pan Novák (1949) - Vasek Kunc
 Rodinné trampoty oficiála Trísky (1949)
 Distant Journey (1950) - Prisoner building a gas chamber #2
 The Proud Princess (1952) - Guard of King's Treasure
 Únos (1953) - American Journalist
 Nad námi svítá (1953) - Kuba
 Haskovy povidky ze stareho mocnarstvi (1954) - Porotce
 Cirkus bude! (1954) - Taxikár Karel
 Music from Mars (1955) - Kulhánek, hrác na cello a kytaru
 Muž v povětří (1956) - Postman
 Vzorný kinematograf Haska Jaroslava (1956)
 Synove hor (1956) - Fotograf
 Florenc 13:30 (1957) - Mr. Konícek
 O věcech nadpřirozených (1959) - Detective (segment "The Secret of a Handwriting")
 Hvězda jede na jih (1959) - Egon Zejda - guitarist
 May Stars (1959) - Rezník
 The Princess with the Golden Star (1959) - Adjutant of King Kazisvet
 Poteryannaya fotografiya (1959)
 Cerná sobota (1959)
 Pochodne (1961) - Dozorce ve vezení
 Procesí k Panence (1961) - chalupník Slapák
 Kazdá koruna dobrá (1961) - False medium
 Florián (1961)
 The Fabulous Baron Munchausen (1962) - Adjutant
 Velká cesta (1963) - Arcivédova
 The Cassandra Cat (1963) - druzstevník Janek
 Lemonade Joe (1964) - Pancho Kid - Gunslinger
 The Secret of the Chinese Carnation (1964)
 A Jester's Tale (1964) - Varga
 Ztracená tvár (1965)
 Who Wants to Kill Jessie? (1966) - Pistolník
 The Pipes (1966) - Pastor
 The Stolen Airship (1967) - Gustav - Cerny
 Martin a devet bláznu (1967) - Kvasnák
 The Incredibly Sad Princess (1968) - Nápadník
 Automat na prání (1968)
 I Killed Einstein, Gentlemen (1970) - Zástupce velitele policie
 On the Comet (1970) - Kaprál Ben
 You Are a Widow, Sir (1971) - Zrízenec na patologii
 Four Murders Are Enough, Darling (1971) - Kovarski
 Straw Hat (1972) - Mayor
 Zlatá svatba (1972) - drobný chovatel Choleva
 Aféry mé zeny (1973) - kostlivec - segment Vrazda Certove Mlýne
 Tri chlapi na cestách (1973) - Valchar
 A Night at Karlstein (1974) - Varlet
 Circus in the Circus (1975) - Veterinár
 Almost King (1977) - Robber
 Long Live Ghosts! (1977) - Mládek
  (1978) - Hofgesellschaft
 Dinner for Adele (1978) - Baddy / Veteran
 Deváté srdce (1979) - Chamberlain
 Hodinárova svatební cesta korálovým morem (1979)
 Buldoci a tresne (1981) - Pepa
 Amadeus (1984)
 ...a zase ta Lucie! (1984) - Electrician
 The Feather Fairy (1985) - Prinzipal
 Falosny princ (1985) - Vezír
 Figurky ze smantu (1987) - cisník Liborek (segment "Návraty")

References

External links
 

1922 births
1993 deaths
Male actors from Prague
Czech male film actors
Czech male stage actors
20th-century Czech male actors
Czechoslovak male actors